Archanai Pookal is a 1982 Indian Tamil-language film written and directed by Gokula Krishnan, starring Chandrasekhar, Mohan, Rajyalakshmi and Subathra. The film was released on 15 October 1982, and failed at the box office.

Plot

Cast 
 Chandrasekhar
 Mohan
 Rajyalakshmi
 Subhathra
 Sangili Murugan
 Manorama
 Poornam Viswanathan
 Senthil

Soundtrack 
The music was composed by Ilaiyaraaja.

References

External links 
 
 

1980s Tamil-language films
1982 films
Films directed by Gokula Krishnan
Films scored by Ilaiyaraaja